Brooklandville House, or the Valley Inn, is a historic restaurant and tavern building, and a former inn, located in Brooklandville, Baltimore County, Maryland.  It is a -story stone structure facing the former railroad and dating from about 1832.  It is associated with the Baltimore and Susquehanna Railroad, which crossed the property just to the south.

Brooklandville House (the Valley Inn), was listed on the National Register of Historic Places on November 23, 1977.  The historic building is situated in the Green Spring Valley Historic District, near Stevenson in Baltimore County, Maryland, United States.

References

External links
The Valley Inn, 10501 Falls Road, Lutherville-Timonium, MD 21093 (The Valley Inn Restaurant website)
The Valley Inn - American Restaurant | Facebook (The Valley Inn Restaurant Facebook Page)
Muffy Fenwick, "Inside The New Valley Inn", Food & Drink Section, Baltimore Fishbowl, March 26, 2014
"Chapter 8: Here's To History: The Valley Inn", pp. 170-171, in Debbie Nunley and Karen Jane Elliott. A Taste of Maryland History: A Guide to Historic Eateries and Their Recipes. Winston-Salem, North Carolina: John F. Blair, Publisher. 2005
, (Photo credit: Jennifer K. Cosham, 03/25/2006, Maryland Historical Trust)
Brooklandville House/Valley Inn, National Register of Historic Places Inventory-Nomination Form. Researched and written March 20, 1968 through April 14, 1977 (Maryland Historical Trust Inventory of Historic Properties)
Brooklandville House/Valley Inn, National Register of Historic Places Inventory-Nomination Form. Researched and written March 20, 1968 through April 14, 1977 (Maryland Historical Trust Inventory of Historic Properties)
 (Photo credit: James T. Wollon, Jr., 07/11/1979, Maryland Historical Trust)
Green Spring Valley Historic District, National Register of Historic Places Inventory-Nomination Form. Researched and written May 1979 through October 1, 1980 (Maryland Historical Trust Inventory of Historic Properties) (See THE VALLEY INN. Item Number 7. Page 3)

Commercial buildings on the National Register of Historic Places in Maryland
Buildings and structures in Baltimore County, Maryland
Brooklandville, Maryland
Commercial buildings completed in 1832
Restaurants in Baltimore
National Register of Historic Places in Baltimore County, Maryland
Restaurants on the National Register of Historic Places
1832 establishments in Maryland